Helena may refer to:

People
Helena (given name), a given name (including a list of people and characters with the name)
Katri Helena (born 1945), Finnish singer
Helena, mother of Constantine I

Places

Greece 
 Helena (island)

Guyana 
 Helena, Guyana

United States 
 Helena, Montana, the capital of Montana
 Helena National Forest, Montana
 Helena, Montana micropolitan area
 Lake Helena, Montana
 Helena, Alabama
 Helena, Arkansas
 Battle of Helena, July 4, 1863, during the American Civil War
 Helena, California
 Helena, Georgia
 Helena, Louisiana
 Helena Township, Michigan
 Helena, Huron County, Michigan
 Helena, Marquette County, Michigan
 Helena Township, Minnesota
 Helena, Mississippi
 Helena, Missouri
 Helena, New York
 Helena, Ohio
 Helena, Oklahoma
 Helena, South Carolina
 Helena, Texas
 Helena, Wisconsin

Canada 

 Helena Island (Nunavut)
 Helena Lake, Saskatchewan

Films
 Helena (1924 film), a silent German film directed by Manfred Noa
 Helena, a 2008 Colombian film 
 Helena, a 2014 Argentine film

Literature

 Helena (Machado de Assis novel), 1876 novel by Machado de Assis
 Helena (Waugh novel), 1950 novel by Evelyn Waugh
 Helena (A Midsummer Night's Dream), a character from William Shakespeare's A Midsummer Night's Dream

Music
 "Helena" (Hugo Raspoet song), 1970
 "Helena" (My Chemical Romance song), 2004
 "Helena Beat", a 2011 song by Foster the People
 "Helena", a song by The Misfits from the 1999 album Famous Monsters
 "Helena", a song by Nickel Creek from the 2005 album Why Should the Fire Die?
 "Helena", a song by Will Haven from the 2007 album The Hierophant
 "Helena", a 1972 song by Jack de Nijs
 "Helena", a 1973 song by Leapy Lee 
 "Helena", a 1963 instrumental by Ladi Geisler

Ships
 HMS Helena, name of various Royal Navy ships
 Helena, a packet boat, built in the United States in 1841
 USS Helena, name of various United States Navy ships
 USS Helena I (SP-24), United States Navy patrol boat

Science
 Helena morpho or Morpho helena, a butterfly of the family Nymphalidae
 "Helena", theoretical founding ancestor of Haplogroup H
 "Helena", name used in ancient Greece for the phenomenon now referred to as St. Elmo's fire
 101 Helena, main belt asteroid

Other uses
 Helena (artwork), a 2000 art installation featuring goldfish in blenders
 HELENA, the Helmholtz Graduate School Environmental Health
 G-AAXF Helena, a named Handley Page H.P.42 airliner

See also
 Elena (disambiguation)
 Eleni (disambiguation)
 Helen (disambiguation)
 Helene (disambiguation)
 Hellen
 Saint Helena (disambiguation)